Kings Siding is a rural locality in the Toowoomba Region, Queensland, Australia.

Geography 
The locality is bounded to the south by the Western railway line. The land use is a mix of crop growing and grazing on native vegetation.

Kings railway siding was on the Western railway on the boundary between the localities of Kings Siding and Kingsthorpe.

History 
The locality was officially named and bounded on 7 September 2001. The name refers to the former KIngs railway siding on the Western railway line which, like neighbouring Kingsthorpe, takes its name King from George King and his family of pastoralists who owned the Gowrie pastoral station from 1841. The siding was established by 1891. In 1902 the siding is called King and Sons' Siding and is adjacent to the coal mine established by the King family, but in 1975 appears simply as King's Siding. 

In the  Kings Siding had a population of 16 people.

Education 
There are no schools in King's Siding. The nearest primary school is Kingsthorpe State School in neighbouring Kingsthorpe to the south-east. The nearest secondary school is Oakey State High School in Oakey to the west.

References 

Toowoomba Region
Localities in Queensland